Edgar Samuel David Graham, MPA, BL (1954 – 7 December 1983), was an Ulster Unionist Party (UUP) politician and academic from Northern Ireland. He was regarded as a rising star of both legal studies and Unionism, and a possible future leader of the UUP, until he was killed on 7 December 1983 by the Provisional Irish Republican Army (IRA).

Career
Graham graduated from the Queen's University of Belfast in 1976. He began working on a Doctorate for the University of Oxford (at Trinity College), and was called to the Bar of Northern Ireland. In 1979 he became a member of the Queen's University Belfast law faculty, lecturing in public law, and was a law faculty colleague of David Trimble.

Graham joined the Ballymena branch of the Ulster Unionist Party at the age of 14. He later became Chairman of the Ulster Young Unionist Council. He subsequently became active in the senior party. In 1982 he addressed the Conservative Party Conference on the subject of Northern Ireland and was singled out as a leader of the future. This led to international invitations such as to Harvard Summer School for leading young lawyers. He was critical of both the British government's perceived indecisiveness and (more quietly) the UUP leadership under James Molyneaux.

Graham was elected a member of the 1982 Northern Ireland Assembly for South Belfast.

Death
In mid-morning on 7 December 1983, while chatting to UUP party and Queen's colleague Dermot Nesbitt at the University Square side of the main campus library, he was shot in the head a number of times by an IRA gunman and died almost instantly. He was 29 years old. Two persons were later convicted of withholding evidence from the police, but no one was ever convicted for his murder.

In a communique taking responsibility for the killing, the IRA command said his killing "should be a salutary lesson to those loyalists who stand foursquare behind the laws and forces of oppression of the nationalist people."  IRA members said that Graham was targeted because of aid and advice he had reportedly given to the Northern Ireland Prison Service

Former IRA member turned police informer Sean O'Callaghan in his book The Informer suggested that the IRA killed him because he was regarded by a journalist as "potentially the most effective political opponent facing Sinn Féin that the Ulster Unionists had yet produced" and likely to become the party leader.

Graham had also gained attention for his strong arguments publicly supporting internment, the revocation of Special Category Status for republican prisoners, and the British government's network of informers.

He had been seen on BBC Northern Ireland, criticising the Thatcher government for not taking a hard enough line against Republican prisoners and hunger strikers.

After Graham's killing, an expression of sympathy was made by James Dooge in Seanad Éireann, the Republic of Ireland's upper house of parliament:

The resultant Assembly by-election on 1 March 1984 was won unopposed by then Ulster Unionist Party Chief Executive Frank Millar Jr.

The UUP leader, Jim (later Lord) Molyneaux, remarked: 

In honour and remembrance to Edgar Graham there is an inscription at the entrance of the debating hall at Stormont that reads:

Sylvia, Lady Hermon, who was then a lawyer, was in the students' union at the time the murder was announced, and has spoken of her revulsion at hearing students cheering news of the killing, and of how she vowed never to set foot in the union again.

Repercussions
Graham's death came just two years after the IRA assassination of the South Belfast M.P. Robert Bradford. To this day, Graham is often spoken of by Unionist political leaders.

David Trimble invoked his friend's killing to contend both that the Unionist community had suffered greatly at the hands of republicans and that more moderate Unionists were willing to take bold moves (especially support for the Good Friday Agreement) and were willing to put their suffering behind them.

Journalist Ed Moloney, in his book, A Secret History of the IRA (2003), contends that Graham's killing was ordered by a restive IRA unit, the Belfast Brigade and Ivor Bell, as part of a campaign that was a direct challenge to Sinn Féin leader Gerry Adams' call for a more "controlled and disciplined" campaign twinned with a growing parliamentary strategy. Moloney argues that Belfast area attacks by the IRA in late 1983, because of their backlash in the middle classes of both communities, in fact strengthened Adams and Sinn Féin's political path.

Despite Graham's murder, violence in Northern Ireland actually continued in a pattern of decline in 1983, with 77 deaths, down from 97 the previous year.  The British Army suffered only five deaths in 1983, its lowest number since 1971, while combined security services suffered 33 deaths (a drop from 40 the year before), and civilian deaths were recorded as 44, the lowest number since 1970.

References

External links
Pat Finucane Centre website
Northern Ireland Assembly, Thursday 15 July 1999
website of David Trimble, Address to the British Irish Association, September 2000
Northern Ireland Assembly, debates, Monday 29 November 1999
Wrecking Trimble, by Ruth Dudley Edwards, Sunday Independent
House of Commons debate: 1995-06-12
speech at Queens University Democratic Unionist Association Anniversary Dinner
Sermon given by the Dean of Belfast Cathedral on Sunday, 6 March 2005, at a service of thanksgiving marking the Centenary of the Ulster Unionist Council
Irish Seanad statement following Graham's murder

Bibliography

1954 births
1983 deaths
Academics of Queen's University Belfast
Assassinated politicians from Northern Ireland
British legal scholars
Northern Ireland MPAs 1982–1986
People killed by the Provisional Irish Republican Army
Ulster Unionist Party politicians
People murdered in Belfast
Deaths by firearm in Northern Ireland
People educated at Ballymena Academy
Alumni of Trinity College, Oxford
1983 murders in the United Kingdom